Streptomyces griseochromogenes is a bacterium species from the genus of Streptomyces which has been isolated from soil. Streptomyces griseochromogenes produces blasticidin A, blasticidin B, blasticidin C, blasticidin S, pentalenene and cytomycin.

See also 
 List of Streptomyces species

References

External links
Type strain of Streptomyces griseochromogenes at BacDive – the Bacterial Diversity Metadatabase

griseochromogenes
Bacteria described in 1955